Thays is a  Pakistani drama serial that first aired on 18 April 2018 on A-Plus TV. It stars Junaid Khan and Hira Mani in lead roles.

Plot

Rubab is in love with Asher. However, Asher is not interested in Rubab. Rubab's mother, Zehra, is very possessive of her daughter. She does not want Rubab and Asher to be together and conspires against Rubab. She writes fake letters on behalf of Asher to Rubab. The letter states that Asher is in love with his colleague and has married her. 

Unable to bear the pain, Rubab tries to commit suicide. Asher gets concerned for Rubab. Zehra then hires a girl who blames Asher for sexual harassment. Zehra gets Rubab married to a man of her choice, unaware that he's a con man. Rubab's husband fleeces her for money and leaves her pregnant. Zehra tries to manipulate the situation again but fails as Rubab discovers the truth. 

Rubab also finds out that Zehra had falsely accused Asher previously. Rubab gets reunited with Asher.

Cast 
Junaid Khan as Asher
Hira Mani as Rubab
Farah Shah as Zehra
Nadia Hussain as Shahishta
Sabiha Hashmi as Raesa 
Nazish Jahangir as Zoya
Tabbasum Arif as Zoya's mother
Birjees Farooqui as Shayan's mother
Waqas Majeed as Ashwaq

Soundtrack 

The title song was performed by Junaid Khan and Hira Mani. The music was composed by Naveed Nashad and the lyrics were written by Ghazala Naqvi. It has more than 1.4 million views on YouTube.

References

External links
  

2018 Pakistani television series debuts
Pakistani drama television series
Urdu-language television shows